Calendar Girls is a 2015 Indian drama film directed by Madhur Bhandarkar and co-produced by Sangeeta Ahir and Bhandarkar Entertainment. Akanksha Puri played a main female lead role. The film's music was composed by Meet Bros Anjjan and Amaal Mallik. The film released on 25 September 2015. According to Bhandarkar, the story of Calendar Girls is 75% reality and 25% fiction.

Plot

The plot begins with photographer Timmy Anand (Rohit Roy) who is in the process of calling the 5 girls whom he has chosen from different parts of India and Pakistan – Mayuri Chauhan (Ruhi Singh) from Rohtak, Paroma Ghosh (Satarupa Pyne) from Kolkata, Nandita Menon (Akanksha Puri) from Hyderabad, Nazneen Malik (Avani Modi) from Lahore and Sharon Pinto (Kyra Dutt) from Goa to come to Mumbai for shooting for the country's most prestigious annual calendar which is a joint effort of a business tycoon, Kumar Kukreja (Suhel Seth) and him.

The story now shifts to give a brief introduction about the personal life of the five girls. Mayuri, who is from Rohtak lives with her parents who are very supportive and encouraging of her becoming a calendar girl and are sure that she will make it big in life. Paroma, who is from Kolkata, has her parents and an elder brother who are not happy about her entering the modelling business. Her father tells her to go if she wants but not come back. Paroma decides to leave and saying that she won't come back, instead she'd call them to Mumbai one day and they will feel proud of her. Nandita, who is from Hyderabad, has her parents and an elder sister. Her family consists of all achievers with her mom and dad being CEOs of a company and her sister Sharda (Samikssha Batnagar) who has recently become the youngest Vice President of a company. Nandita has decided to make it big by becoming a calendar girl. Nazneen, who is from Lahore stays with her boyfriend Inzamam (Deepak Wadhwa) in London and feels that she has still not achieved anything big in life yet and calendar girl will be a platform for her to get into Bollywood. However Inzamam is not supportive of this, but she slaps him and decides to leave. Sharon who is from Goa is jogging on the beach with her friend who tells her about how bad the glamour world is and she shouldn't be going for this but she does not believe much about the rumours of the glamour world and decides to go ahead.

The five girls are all geared up and have high dreams about the calendar. They go to Mauritius for shooting with Timmy and are out with the wonderful pictures which will be shown in the annual calendar which will be used at different places. They are in the calendar launch party where they are meeting different people from the glamour industry for film offers, modelling assignments, advertisement contracts, etc. and are very happy and feel that their life is going to change from now on.

The story then moves to three months later. Paroma is a chief guest in a Bengali pooja organized by some pandal and there she meets Pinaki Chatterjee (Keith Sequeira) who is her old boyfriend from Kolkata. Pinaki persuades Paroma to revive their relationship and she agrees. Sharon is doing an ad and is very happy that she has selected Aniruddh Shroff (Rushad Rana) to take care of her work to get her assignments. Nazneen has got an offer for a Bollywood film from a very noted producer and the producer has kept a strict schedule for completing the film and also offers her a check for the signing amount and she is very happy. Mayuri is at her first day of shooting for the film and is advised by her secretary Tiwariji (Atul Parchure) to make a good impression with the crew members from the very first day. Mayuri gets very friendly with the director and the crew members and she uses her social networking skills tweeting about the movie several times to get a good publicity for it. The director feels that she will do very well in life. Nandita is attending a ceremony in Jodhpur where she is chatting with Naina (Suchitra Pillai) who is a socialite. She declares that Nandita is one of her favourite calendar girls. Naina then introduces Nandita to Harsh Narang (Vikram Sakhalkar) who is a very big business tycoon and the heir of the royal Narang family of Jodhpur. Harsh asks Nandita about her future plans and she tells that she is returning to Mumbai by flight the following morning. Harsh advises her to cancel her flight offering her a marriage proposal. Nandita doesn't answer initially but her sister advises that she should go ahead with this marriage stating that she will be living a very comfortable life like a queen. Nandita is reluctant to give up on the condition kept by Harsh to quit modelling, but her sister says that next year when the new calendar comes, offers will go down and slowly she may have to end her association with the modelling world. Nandita meets Harsh's parents, the Narangs (Kiran Kumar) and tells them that she has decided to quit modelling and the family gives her a warm welcome resulting in them getting married.

Nazneen is travelling in a taxi and sees that there are some public protests on the road against Pakistani stars to quit the country. She is very tensed about her life being harmed and the city being unsafe for her. She is not in a position to go back to London since Inzamam is very angry on her. The producer who offered her the film has decided to withdraw the offer because of this issue and is unable to delay the film. She loses the film and is without any work. Few days later, she meets Ananya Raichand (Mita Vashisht) who runs a high class escort service for Politicians, Industrialists and Diplomats. Nazneen ends up becoming an escort girl. Sharon goes to a party at a friends place and there she meets Rehaan who is a friend of Aniruddh and gets to know about the rumours that Aniruddh spread about her that she slept with him. She gets very angry and slaps Aniruddh in front of his entire office staff. She ends up banned by the ad world and is unable to get any assignments on account of spoiling her relationship with Aniruddh. Paroma is attending a party where she has been invited by Pinaki and he introduces her to the different cricketers and people from the SPL cricket league. Pinaki tells her later about some issues that he is facing on the gambling with which they were to earn millions of rupees, where he wants Paroma to spend time with one of the cricketers as per his conditions. Paroma does so and they earn a lot with the daily matches of SPL. Vignesh Pranjpe (Sharad Ponkshe) who is a CBI officer has a doubt on them and keeps a close eye.

Sharon meets Shashank Datta (Indraneil Sengupta) who is working in a leading news channel offers her a job as a host for one of their new entertainment show and Sharon becomes a very successful anchor later being promoted by the channel to a nationwide news reader. Mayuri has decided to sign a film with a builder's son for millions of rupees just to buy a flat through him and later meets Madhur Bhandarkar who also offers her a film. Nandita finds that Harsh is cheating on her and has married her just to keep her as a trophy wife and sleeps around with escort girls. She tells her in-laws and cries but they explain that Harsh loves her and she is the daughter-in-law of the big Narang family and these things are very common amongst the riches.

Paroma gets arrested by CBI on the betting and match fixing case and Pinaki goes absconding leaving her in a lurch. Her brother and father come to give her a bail and tell her how shameful the family is feeling in the society because of her and disown her. She attempts suicide but stops as she gets an offer to work in a reality show because of her controversial image. Nazneen is feeling shameful about the job she is doing as an escort girl and wants to quit and go back to London. She decides to do it one last time with a foreign diplomat. But she finds that Inzamam has already dumped her and moved with someone else. Nazneen meets with an accident after escaping from the hotel and dies.

After these incidents that happened with the calendar girls especially Paroma and Nazneen, this issue comes in the news on whether calendar girls is a platform for people to make a career in the glamour industry or is it a misuse. The other 4 calendar girls meet at Nazneen's funeral and are very sad that her body was in the morgue for 10 days and nobody claimed it. They realize how the glamor world is and how you need to live with it.

Days pass by, months pass by and it is shown where are the calendar girls now – Paroma is making her entry to the reality show, Sharon will happily marry Shashank, Mayuri receives the best debutant award in Filmfare and Nandita is pregnant with a child with Harsh. Now the new year comes and the old calendar is removed and the new calendar is used at various places with the five new calendar girls.

Teaser
Suhel Seth and Rohit Roy played significant role in Calendar Girls. Five new actresses have made their debut in Hindi film industry with Calendar Girls. The teaser of Calendar Girls was released on 1 July 2015. The film's trailer was released on 17 August 2015. Calendar Girls was banned in Pakistan.

Release
Calendar Girls was released on 25 September 2015.

Cast

 Akanksha Puri as Nandita Menon, from Hyderabad
 Avani Modi as Nazneen Malik, from Lahore
 Kyra Dutt as Sharon Pinto, from Goa
 Ruhi Singh as Mayuri Chauhan, from Rohtak
 Satarupa Pyne as Paroma Ghosh, from Kolkata
 Keith Sequeira as Pinaki (Paroma's boyfriend)
 Deepak Wadhwa as Inzamam (Nazneen's boyfriend)
 Indraneil Sengupta as Shashank (Sharon's husband)
 Vikram Sakhalkar as Harsh Narang (Nandita's husband)
 Mita Vasisht as Escort broker
 Suhel Seth as Kumar Kukreja, calendar sponsor
 Rohit Roy as Timmy, Photographer Berak Celana, (called calendar partner in North America and Bruce Lee in UK)
 Karan Aanand as Paroma's brother
 Kiran Kumar as Narang's
 Atul Parchure as Tiwari Ji, Mayuri's secretary
 Madhur Bhandarkar (cameo) as himself
 Suchitra Pillai as Naina, Socialite
 Samikssha Batnagar as Nandita's sister
 Shishir Sharma as Mayuri's father
 Sharad Ponkshe as CBI officer
 Tanuj Virwani as Varun
 Yogesh Lakhani as Jury

Soundtrack

The music for the film was composed by Meet Bros Anjjan and Amaal Mallik, while the lyrics were by Kumaar. The full audio album was released on 10 September 2015 by T-Series.

Critical reception
Bollywood Hungama rated the film three-and-a-half stars out of five, describing the five calendar girl characters as "very relatable". The site summarized, "On the whole, Calendar Girls can be watched for its wholesome entertainment value, hard hitting drama and engaging narrative." Subhash K. Jha rated the film three stars out of five, saying, "It is fairly engaging and sometimes powerful in its message on how far the ruthless metropolis takes the unsuspecting career girls before dumping them on the derrières to re-gather their destiny."

See also

 Kingfisher Calendar

 Atul Kasbekar

References

External links
 
 

2015 films
2010s Hindi-language films
Indian drama films
Indian female buddy films
India–Pakistan relations in popular culture
Films about fashion in India
Films about women in India
Films directed by Madhur Bhandarkar
Films shot in Mumbai
Films shot in Mauritius
High society (social class)
Indian buddy films
2010s female buddy films
Indian films based on actual events
2015 drama films
Hindi-language drama films